Benjamin List (born 11 January 1968) is a German chemist who is one of the directors of the Max Planck Institute for Coal Research and professor of organic chemistry at the University of Cologne. He co-developed organocatalysis, a method of accelerating chemical reactions and making them more efficient. He shared the 2021 Nobel Prize in Chemistry with David MacMillan "for the development of asymmetric organocatalysis".

Background
Born to an upper-middle-class family of scientists and artists in Frankfurt, List is a great-grandson of the cardiologist Franz Volhard and a 2nd great-grandson of the chemist Jacob Volhard. His aunt, the 1995 Nobel laureate in medicine Christiane Nüsslein-Volhard, is the sister of his mother, architect Heidi List. At age three, his parents divorced.

Career and research
List obtained his Diplom (M.Sc.) degree in chemistry from the Free University of Berlin in 1993, and his PhD from Goethe University Frankfurt in 1997. His doctoral dissertation was titled Synthese eines Vitamin B 12 Semicorrins (Synthesis of a Vitamin B 12 Semicorrin), and was advised by Johann Mulzer. List worked at the Scripps Research Institute Department of Molecular Biology in La Jolla, US as a postdoctoral researcher in Carlos F. Barbas III and Richard Lerner's research groups from 1997 to 1998 with a scholarship from the Alexander von Humboldt Foundation and as an assistant professor from 1999 to 2003.

In 2003 he returned to Germany to become group leader at the Max Planck Institute for Coal Research, and in 2005 he became one of the institute's directors, heading the Homogeneous Catalysis Department. He served as the institute's managing director from 2012 to 2014. He has held a part-time position as an honorary professor of organic chemistry at the University of Cologne since 2004. List is also a principal investigator at the Institute for Chemical Reaction Design and Discovery, Hokkaido University since 2018. He is the editor-in-chief of the scientific journal Synlett. , he has an h-index of 95 according to Google Scholar and of 86 according to Scopus.

List is considered to be one of the founders of organocatalysis, which uses non-metal and non-enzyme catalysts. In particular, while still an assistant professor he discovered the possibility of using the amino acid proline as an efficient chiral catalyst. This takes place in intermolecular aldol reactions, in which carbon atoms from two different molecules are bonded together, induced by proline. The development is based on the Hajos–Parrish–Eder–Sauer–Wiechert reaction. Subsequently, he developed the first proline-catalyzed Mannich, Michael, and α-amination reactions. He found asymmetric catalysis (especially Asymmetric counteranion directed catalysis, ACDC). He developed also new methods of textile organic catalysis, in which soluble organic catalysts and textiles are bound. These methods could, for example, help to treat water where there is no fresh water. Asymmetric organocatalysis is particularly important in bioactive organic compounds, where the chirality of the compounds is important, for example in drug production.

On 6 October 2021, he was awarded the Nobel Prize in Chemistry with David MacMillan "for the development of asymmetric organocatalysis." The development has great influence on pharmaceutical research and the drug production and "made chemistry greener".

Personal life
List married Dr. Sabine List in La Jolla in 1999 and they have two sons, Theo and Paul. They all survived the 2004 Indian Ocean earthquake and tsunami.

List's parents sought to raise their children with an anti-authoritarian parenting style; he has admitted occasionally using the approach with his own children, stating that "you may only be 12, but if you think it will do you good to eat ten chocolate bars, then go ahead and do it. I have faith in you. But my advice is: I wouldn’t do it."

Honors and awards
Source:

1994 NaFöG-Award from the City of Berlin
1997 Feodor Lynen Fellowship of the Alexander von Humboldt Foundation
2000 Synthesis-Synlett Journal Award
2003  of the German Chemical Society
2004 Degussa Prize for Chiral Chemistry
2004 Lecturer’s Award of the Fonds der Chemischen Industrie
2004 Lieseberg Prize of the University of Heidelberg
2005 AstraZeneca European Lectureship, the Society of Synthetic Chemistry, Japan
2005 Lectureship Award
2005 Novartis Young Investigator Award
2006 JSPS Fellowship Award of Japan
2007 AstraZeneca Award in Organic Chemistry
2007 Award of the Fonds der Chemischen Industrie
2007 OBC-Lecture Award
2008 Visiting Professor at Sungkyunkwan University, Korea
2009 Boehringer-Ingelheim Lectureship, Canada
2009 Organic Reactions Lectureship, US
2009 Thomson Reuters Citation Laureate
2011 Boehringer-Ingelheim Lectureship, Harvard University, US
2011 ERC Advanced Grant
2012 Novartis Chemistry Lectureship Award
2012 Otto Bayer Award
2013 Horst-Pracejus-Preis
2013 Mukaiyama Award
2013 Ruhrpreis, Mülheim, Germany
2014 Cope Scholar Award, US
2014 Thomson Reuters Highly Cited Researcher
2015 Carl Shipp Marvel Lectures, University of Illinois at Urbana-Champaign, US
2016 Gottfried Wilhelm Leibniz Prize
2017 Prof. U. R. Ghatak Endowment Lecture, Indian Association for the Cultivation of Science (IACS), Kolkata, India
2017 Ta-shue Chou Lectureship, Institute of Chemistry, Academia Sinica, Taipei, Taiwan
2018 Member of the German National Academy of Sciences Leopoldina
2019 Herbert C. Brown Lecture, Purdue University, Indiana, US
2019	Web of Science Citation Laureate in Chemistry
2021	TCR Lecture, 100th CSJ Annual Meeting, Japan
2021 Nobel Prize in Chemistry
2022 Herbert C. Brown Award 2022 for Creative Research in Synthetic Methodes

Selected works
Source:

References

External links

 

1968 births
Free University of Berlin alumni
German Nobel laureates
Goethe University Frankfurt alumni
Gottfried Wilhelm Leibniz Prize winners
Living people
Members of the German Academy of Sciences Leopoldina
Nobel laureates in Chemistry
Organic chemists
Scientists from Frankfurt
Max Planck Institute directors